Cruel and unusual is commonly used to describe certain controversial forms of physical punishment, for which see:

Cruel and unusual punishment

Other uses
 Cruel and Unusual (comics), a 1999 comic book series
 Cruel and Unusual (2006 film), a 2006 documentary film
 Cruel and Unusual (2014 film), a 2014 thriller film
 Cruel and Unusual (novel), a novel by Patricia Cornwell
 Cruel and Unusual: Bush/Cheney's New World Order, a book by Mark Crispin Miller
 Cruel and Unusual Films, an American film production company
 Watchtower (2001 film), a 2001 Canadian thriller film also released under the title Cruel and Unusual